Dumitru Stăniloae (– 4 October 1993) was a Romanian Orthodox Christian priest, theologian and professor. He worked for over 45 years on a comprehensive Romanian translation of the Greek Philokalia, a collection of writings on prayer by the Church Fathers, together with the hieromonk, Arsenie Boca, who brought manuscripts from Mount Athos. His book, The Dogmatic Orthodox Theology (1978), made him one of the best-known Christian theologians of the second half of the 20th century. He also produced commentaries on earlier Christian thinkers, such as St Gregory of Nyssa, Saint Maximus the Confessor, and St Athanasius of Alexandria. He is also remembered as editor in chief of the regional orthodox newspaper Telegraful Român (1934–1945) where he imposed a nationalist and antisemitic editorial line.

Biography
Dumitru Stăniloae was born on 16 November 1903, in Vlădeni, in what is now Brașov County, Romania. He was the last of five children of Rebeca (mother) and Irimie (father). His mother was a priest's niece. On 10 February 1917 he went to Brașov to study at the Andrei Șaguna High School. He received a fellowship from the Gojdu Foundation in 1918 and a fellowship from the University of Cernăuți in 1922. Disappointed by the quality of the manuals and the teaching methods, he left for the University of Bucharest after one year. He was offered a fellowship by metropolitan bishop Nicolae Bălan at the Metropolitan Center in Sibiu in 1924 during Lent. Stăniloae graduated from the University of Cernăuți in 1927, receiving a fellowship to study theology in Athens. In the fall of 1928 he earned his PhD degree at Cernăuți, with thesis Life and work of Dositheos II of Jerusalem (1641-1707) and his connections with Romanian Principalities. The Metropolitan Center in Sibiu offered him a fellowship in Byzantine studies and Dogmatics. He went to Munich to attend the courses of August Heisenberg (father of physicist Werner Heisenberg), and then went to Berlin, Paris, and Istanbul to study the work of Gregory Palamas.

He married on 4 October 1930, and his wife gave birth to twins in 1931, named Dumitru and Maria. He and his wife had another daughter, Lidia, on 8 October of the following year; and that year he met and befriended ultra-right ideologist Nichifor Crainic.

In January 1934, Stăniloae took over as editor in chief of the Transylvanian bi-weekly church newspaper Telegraful român (The Romanian Telegraph). He would hold the position until May 1945. Under the previous editor in chief, George Proca, Telegraful român had published ambivalent articles about the Jewish minority. Under Stăniloae, the editorial line became aggressively antisemitic. It published eulogies of legionaries Ion Moța and Vasile Marin, far-right politician A. C. Cuza, Romanian dictator Ion Antonescu and even Adolf Hitler. As antisemitic legislation was adopted by the successive Romanian governments Telegraful supported the legislation. Deportations of Roma and Jews were also encouraged. Some editorials (including a 1942 article suggestively titled Au să dispară din Europa, i.e., They will disappear from Europe) go as far as advocating the Final Solution.

Stăniloae was ordained a deacon on 8 October 1931 and was ordained priest on 25 September 1932. In June 1936 he became rector of the Theological Academy in Sibiu. In 1940, at the initiative of poet Sandu Tudor, the Rugul aprins (Burning Bush) group was founded. It was composed of priest-monk Ivan Kulighin (confessor of Russian Metropolitan bishop of Rostov, refugee at Cernica Monastery), priest-monk Benedict Ghius, priest-monk Sofian Boghiu, Prof. Alex. Mironescu, poet Vasile Voiculescu, architect Constantin Joja, Father Andrei Scrima and Ion Marin Sadoveanu. The group gathered regularly at the Cernica and Antim monasteries, maintaining Christian life in Bucharest.

In 1946 he was asked by metropolitan bishop Nicolae Bălan, under pressure from Petru Groza, first Communist Prime Minister of Romania, to resign as rector of the Theological Academy in Sibiu. He remained a professor until 1947, when he was transferred to the University of Bucharest's Faculty of Theology, as the Ascetics and Mystics chair.

Because of political unrest in Romania in 1958, following a split in the Romanian Communist Party, Father Dumitru was arrested by the Securitate on 5 September. While he was in Aiud Prison as a political prisoner, his only surviving child, Lidia, gave birth to his grandchild, Dumitru Horia. Lidia was asked to leave the University of Bucharest's Faculty of Physics because of the arrest of her father.

He was freed from prison in January 1963, and then began work as a clerk at the Holy Synod of the Romanian Orthodox Church, and began teaching again in October. He attended conferences in Freiburg and Heidelberg at the invitation of Prof. Paul Miron, with the permission of the State Department of Cults, who wanted to change the image of Romania. While lecturing at Oxford University, he became friends with the theologian Donald Allchin. He retired in 1973.

He received honorary doctorates from the University of Thessaloniki in 1976, the Saint-Serge Orthodox Institute in Paris in 1981, the Faculty of Orthodox Theology in Belgrade in 1982, and the University of Bucharest in 1992. He was awarded the Dr. Leopold Lucas prize of the Faculty of Theology in Tübingen in 1980 and the Cross of St Augustine in Canterbury in 1982.

He died in Bucharest on 5 October 1993, at the age of 90.

See also
 Lucian Turcescu
 Vladimir Lossky

Works

 Catholicism after the War, Sibiu, 1932
 Life and teachings of Gregory Palamas, Sibiu, 1938
 Orthodoxy and Romanianism, Sibiu, 1939
 The standing of Mr. Lucian Blaga on Christianity and Orthodoxism, Sibiu, 1942
 Jesus Christ or man's restoration, Sibiu, 1943
 Philokalia (translation); vol. 1: Sibiu, 1946; vol. 2: Sibiu, 1947; vol. 3: Sibiu, 1948; vol. 4: Sibiu, 1948; vol. 5: Bucharest, 1976; vol. 6: Bucharest, 1977; vol. 7: Bucharest, 1978; vol. 8: Bucharest, 1979; vol. 9: Bucharest, 1980.
 Uniatism in Transylvania, an attempt to dismember the Romanian people, Bucharest, 1973
 Treaty of Orthodox Dogmatic Theology, Bucharest, 1978
 Dieu est Amour, Geneva, 1980
 Theology and the Church, New York City, 1980
 Praying, freedom, holiness, Athens, 1980
 Prière de Jésus et experience de Saint Esprit, Desclée de Brouwer, Paris, 1981
 Orthodox Spirituality, Bucharest, 1981
 Moral Orthodox Theology, vol. 2, Bucharest, 1981
 St. Gregory of Nyssa – Writings (translation), Bucharest, 1982
 Orthodoxe Dogmatik, 1985
 Le genie de l'orthodoxie, Paris, 1985
 Spirituality a communion in Orthodox lithurgy, Craiova, 1986.
 God's eternal face, Craiova, 1987
 St. Athanasius the Great – Writings (translation), Bucharest, 1987
  Orthodox Dogmatic Theology Studies (Christology of St. Maximus the Confessor, Man and God, St. Symeon The New Theologian, Hymns of God's love), Craiova, 1991
 St. Cyril of Alexandria – Writings (translation), Bucharest, 1991

In English Translation:

 The Victory of the Cross: A Talk on Suffering,  Fairacres Publications, Oxford, 1970
 Theology and the Church, SVS Press, Crestwood, 1980
 Liturgy of the Community and the Liturgy of the Heart: From the Viewpoint of the Philokalia, Fairacres Publications, Oxford, 1980
 Prayer and Holiness: The Icon of God Renewed in Man, Fairacres Publications, Oxford, 1982
 Eternity and Time, Fairacres Publications, Oxford, 2001
 Orthodox Spirituality: A Practical Guide for the Faithful and a Definitive Manual for the Scholar, STS Press, South Canaan, 2002 (translation of Orthodox Spirituality, Bucharest, 1981)
 The Experience of God: Orthodox Dogmatic Theology. Holy Cross Orthodox Press 
 Vol. 1, Revelation and Knowledge of the Triune God (Brookline, 2005). 
 Vol. 2, The World: Creation and Deification (Brookline, 2005). 
 Vol. 3, The Person of Jesus Christ as God and Savior (Brookline, 2011).   
 Vol. 4, The Church: Communion in the Holy Spirit (Brookline, 2012). 
 Vol. 5, The Sanctifying Mysteries (Brookline, 2012). 
 Vol. 6, The Fulfillment of Creation (Brookline, 2013).
 The Holy Trinity: In the Beginning There Was Love, Holy Cross Orthodox Press (Brookline, 2012)

References

Further reading
 Kevin M. Berger, Towards a Theological Gnoseology: The Synthesis of Fr. Dumitru Stăniloae Vol's 1-2 (2003. UMI, Ann Arbor) Catholic University of America, Doctoral Dissertation
 Radu Bordeianu, Dumitru Stăniloae: An Ecumenical Ecclesiology (2011.  T&T Clark, Bloomsbury)  
 Andrew Louth, 'The Orthodox Dogmatic Theology of Dumitru Staniloae', in Modern Theology; 2 (1997), p. 253-266
 Charles Miller, The Gift of the World –  An introduction to the theology of Dumitru Stăniloae (2000)
 Mihail Neamțu, 'Between the Gospel And the Nation: Dumitru Stăniloae's Ethno-Theology', in ARCHAEUS. Studies in History of Religions; 10:3 (2006)'
 Ivana Noble, 'Doctrine of Creation within the Theological Project of Dumitru Stăniloae', in Communio Viatorum; 49:2 (2007), pp. 185–209.
 S.-L. Toma, Η πατερική παράδοσις εις το έργον του π. Δημητρίου Στανιλοάε και ο σύγχρονος κόσμος (2007.  Θεσσαλονίκη: Πουρναράς).
 Lucian Turcescu, 'Dumitru Stăniloae', Commentary and Original Source materials in English translation, in The Teachings of Modern Christianity on Law, Politics, and Human Nature, edd. J. Witte and F. Alexander (2 vols. 2005. Columbia University Press, New York), 1:685–711 and 2:537–558. [The two volumes received the Choice Outstanding Academic Titles Award for 2006.]
 Lucian Turcescu, ed. Dumitru Staniloae: tradition and modernity in theology (2002.  Center for Romanian Studies, Iași) 
 Mircea Ițu (2006), "Îndumnezeirea omului in viziunea lui Dumitru Stăniloae" ("Inner godliness of the human being in Dumitru Stăniloae's vision"), in Lumină lină, number 4, New York, pp. 15–23. ISSN 1086-2366

External links

  Dumitru Stăniloae article in Dictionary of Romanian Theologians 
  Freely downloadable interviews (audio and video) can be found at www.sfaturiortodoxe.ro and www.ortodox.tv
  From East to West, interview with Sorin Dumitrescu on Eastern vs. Western spirituality 
  Dacă n-ar fi iubirea Tatălui și a Duhului, n-ar fi nici Hristos, interview 
  Teologie Dogmatică Ortodoxă freely downloadable at Bilioteca Teologică Digitală (Digital Theologic Library)
  Scurtă interpretare teologică a națiunii by Dumitru Stăniloae
  Învierea Domnului și importanța ei universală by Dumitru Stăniloae
  Liviu Jitianu: Christologische Symphonie von Mensch und Welt. Grundzüge einer neupatristischen orthodoxen Theologie im Werk von Dumitru Staniloae''. Dissertation, Freiburg University, Freiburg 2006 ("Christological symphony of man and world. Outlines of a neo-patristic orthodox theology in the works of Dumitru Staniloae"; online version)

1903 births
1993 deaths
People from Brașov County
Andrei Șaguna National College (Brașov) alumni
Chernivtsi University alumni
University of Bucharest alumni
Inmates of Aiud prison
Eastern Orthodox theologians
Romanian Orthodox priests
Romanian theologians
Romanian writers
Christian writers
Titular members of the Romanian Academy
20th-century Eastern Orthodox priests
Translators of the Philokalia
Burials at Cernica Monastery Cemetery